Treasure Buddies is a 2012 American comedy film directed by Robert Vince and produced by Anna McRoberts. It is the 6th installment in the Air Buddies franchise. The Buddies head to the ruins of Ancient Egypt, where, with the help of a monkey named Babi and a camel named Cammy, they explore tombs, escape booby traps, and race against a Sphynx named Ubasti in search of treasure. It was released by Walt Disney Studios Home Entertainment on DVD, Blu-ray, and as a movie download on January 31, 2012.

Plot
The film opens with a pickpocketing monkey named Babi who tells his nephew, Babu how he met the Buddies. Their great uncle Digger was the partner of an archaeologist Thomas Howard, who retrieved one half of a dial which would lead to Queen Cleocatra's tomb. He never found the other half and retired. The scene then switches to present Fernfield where Thomas is giving his grandson Pete a tour of the Egyptian exhibit. The Buddies are also there. Pete stays behind with Thomas who gives his dog, MudBud, Digger's bandanna. A British archaeologist, Phillip Wellington along with his cat, Ubasti, meets Thomas in his office and reveals that he has the other half of the dial. He insists on bringing him and Pete along for the ride, but refuses to bring along MudBud due to his cat's certain allergies. Fortunately, the Buddies stow away in Phillip's DC-3 Douglas airliner via a box of TNT.

Once arriving in Egypt, the three meet Phillip's assistants Tarik and Seti, while the Buddies meet a monkey named Babi (who stole Budderball's kebab) and a young camel calf named Cammy who Rosebud promises to help her find her mother.

The group began discovering clues to Cleocatra's tomb, but while doing so, Pete and Thomas learn that Phillip is a grave robber who seeks to get rid of them after they find the treasure in the tomb. The Buddies follow Pete, Thomas, and the others in a hot air balloon but are forced to take shelter in a cave when a sudden sandstorm strikes. The cave is revealed to be a passage to the tomb. There they meet and defeat Slither, a king cobra and protector of the tomb. Babi then abandons the Buddies due to cowardice.

Meanwhile after hiding out, Thomas and Peter discover the pyramid which was unveiled during the sandstorm and manage to gain entrance. After encountering several traps, which results in Seti's death, the discover Cleocatra's tomb. The Buddies arrive at the tomb, where B-Dawg takes the Collar of Cleocatra and puts it on, slowly turning into a cat in the process. They then fend off living cat statues using the traps they encountered earlier. B-Dawg eventually removes the collar and Ubasti manages to steal it.

Phillip challenges Thomas to a fierce duel after Ubasti is turned to stone after wearing Cleocatra's collar. Although he gains the upper hand, he is dazed when Peter slams a golden plate into his head. He escapes with the collar but is captured by the Nomads, tied to a camel, and (per request) is placed under the custody of the British Embassy. Thomas and Pete are declared national heroes along with the Buddies and the collar is put on permanent display in the museum in Fernfield.

Cast
 Richard Riehle as Thomas Howard
 Edward Herrmann as Dr. Phillip Wellington
 Mason Cook as Pete Howard
 Adam Alexi-Malle as Amir Sabbagh
 Mo Gallini as Tarik
 Christopher Maleki as Seti
 Ranya Jaber as Farah
 Anna Primiani as Cleopatra

Voice cast
 Skyler Gisondo as B-Dawg
 Charles Henry Wyson as Buddha
 Ty Panitz as MudBud
 Tucker Albrizzi as Budderball
 Genevieve Hannelius as Rosebud
 Maulik Pancholy as Babi, a mischievous pick-pocketing capuchin monkey. He helps the Buddies look for Cammy's parents.
 Kaitlyn Maher as Cammy, a baby dromedary camel. She goes with the Buddies in order to look for her parents.
 Elaine Hendrix as Ubasti, a Sphynx cat and the primary antagonist.
Bonnie Somerville as Mala, a dromedary and Cammy's mother.
 Ryan Stiles as Slither, a mystical cobra.
 Tim Conway as Deputy Sniffer
 Aidan Gemme as Babu

Release

Home media
Treasure Buddies was released on DVD, Blu-ray, and as a film download on January 31, 2012. The physical release was produced in 2 different packages: a 2-disc Blu-ray / DVD combo pack and a 1-disc DVD. The movie download was produced in both standard and high definition. Bonus features for the release included "DIGS: B-Dawg Edition" and a music video for "Roam".

References

External links

2012 films
Canadian direct-to-video films
2012 direct-to-video films
American direct-to-video films
Disney direct-to-video films
American children's comedy films
Films set in Egypt
Films directed by Robert Vince
Air Bud (series)
Canadian children's comedy films
Treasure hunt films
2010s English-language films
2010s Canadian films
2010s American films